Boss of Boomtown is a 1944 Western film directed by  Ray Taylor. It stars  Rod Cameron, Tom Tyler and Fuzzy Knight.

See also
List of American films of 1944

References

External links 
 

1944 films
1944 Western (genre) films
American Western (genre) films
Universal Pictures films
Films directed by Ray Taylor
American black-and-white films
1940s American films